There have been three baronetcies created for persons with the surname Noel, two in the Baronetage of England and one in the Baronetage of Great Britain. One creation is extant as of 2008.

The Noel Baronetcy, of Brook in the County of Rutland, was created in the Baronetage of England on 29 June 1611. For more information on this creation, see the Earl of Gainsborough (1682 creation).

The Noel Baronetcy, of Kirkby Mallery in the County of Leicester, was created in the Baronetage of England on 4 July 1660 for Verney Noel. The sixth Baronet succeeded as ninth Baron Wentworth in 1745. For further history of the baronetcy, see this title.

The Middleton, later Noel Baronetcy, of the Navy, was created in the Baronetage of Great Britain on 23 October 1781. For more information on this creation, see the Earl of Gainsborough (1841 creation).

Noel baronets, of Brook (1611)
see the Earl of Gainsborough (1682 creation)

Noel baronets, of Kirkby Mallery (1660)
Sir Verney Noel, 1st Baronet (died 1670)
Sir William Noel, 2nd Baronet (1642–1675)
Sir Thomas Noel, 3rd Baronet (–1688)
Sir John Noel, 4th Baronet (–1697)
Sir Clobery Noel, 5th Baronet (–1733)
Sir Edward Noel, 6th Baronet (1715–1774) (succeeded as Baron Wentworth in 1745)
see the Baron Wentworth for further succession

Middleton, later Noel baronets, of the Navy (1781)
see the Earl of Gainsborough (1841 creation)

 Notes 

 References 
Kidd, Charles, Williamson, David (editors). Debrett's Peerage and Baronetage'' (1990 edition). New York: St Martin's Press, 1990, 

 

Baronetcies in the Baronetage of Great Britain
Extinct baronetcies in the Baronetage of England
1611 establishments in England
1781 establishments in Great Britain